Sébastien Delfosse (born 29 November 1982) is a Belgian former professional road bicycle racer, who rode professionally between 2008 and 2018 for the  and  teams. He has also worked as a directeur sportif for Belgian amateur team Pesant Club Liégeois.

Career
Born in Oupeye and prior to turning professional, Delfosse also competed for the  team. Having previously taken a podium finish at the 2012 Classic Loire Atlantique, Delfosse achieved his first two professional UCI victories within the space of a week, in May 2013. His first victory came at the Circuit de Wallonie in Lambusart, when he managed to fend off the rest of the field and soloed to victory, having been part of the early breakaway of the race. The following weekend, Delfosse won the 1.1-rated Rund um Köln in Cologne, after again featuring in the race breakaway. Delfosse out-sprinted two other riders for the honours, beating Pieter Jacobs and Georg Preidler at the finish.

Delfosse moved to the  team for the 2014 season, after his previous team –  – folded.

Personal life
Delfosse's older sister Kathy also competed professionally. Following his retirement from the professional peloton, Delfosse became a salesman at a Decathlon sporting goods store in Verviers.

Major results

2006
 7th Overall Le Triptyque des Monts et Châteaux
 8th Vlaamse Havenpijl
2007
 1st Kattekoers
 1st Flèche Ardennaise
 3rd Romsée–Stavelot–Romsée
2009
 4th Dwars door het Hageland
2010
 2nd GP José Dubois
 3rd Profkoers Sint-Niklaas
2011
 1st GP José Dubois
 5th Bolinne–Harlue
 7th Heistse Pijl
 10th Kattekoers
2012
 3rd Classic Loire Atlantique
 4th Bolinne–Harlue
 7th Overall Tour de Luxembourg
2013
 1st Circuit de Wallonie
 1st Rund um Köln
 3rd Polynormande
 7th Heistse Pijl
 10th Volta Limburg Classic
2014
 2nd La Drôme Classic
 2nd Cholet-Pays de Loire
 3rd Overall Tour de Bretagne
1st  Combination classification
 5th Overall Four Days of Dunkirk
 5th Polynormande
 9th Route Adélie
2015
 1st  Overall Tour de Bretagne
 1st  Sprints classification Tour de Wallonie
 3rd La Drôme Classic
 4th Internationale Wielertrofee Jong Maar Moedig
 6th Dwars door de Vlaamse Ardennen
 7th Velothon Wales
 8th Classic Loire Atlantique
 9th Paris–Camembert
2016
 7th Overall Tour de Bretagne
 10th Circuit de Wallonie
2017
 1st La Drôme Classic

References

External links
 
 Crelan-Euphony profile
 
 

1982 births
Living people
People from Oupeye
Belgian male cyclists
Cyclists from Liège Province